Ralph Moore (born 24 December 1956) is an English jazz saxophonist.

Early life
Moore was born in Brixton, London, England. His mother was the dancer Josie Woods, and his father was in the US military. He spent his childhood in Brixton, and after trying various instruments, took up the tenor saxophone at the age of 14.

In 1972, he moved to Santa Maria, California, to live with his father. His mother had not wanted him to grow up in Brixton. "Around 1975 he moved to Boston, where he played locally and attended the Berklee College of Music. His studies were interrupted when his apartment was robbed and he was shot and seriously wounded, and he never received a degree."

Later life and career
Moore began his professional career with a tour of Scandinavia in 1979. He moved to New York the following year. He was part of Horace Silver's band from 1981 to 1985, including for tours of Europe and Japan, and recordings. He then played with numerous musicians, including Roy Haynes (around 1982–86), Darrell Grant (1986–87), Dizzy Gillespie's reunion band (1987), Freddie Hubbard (around 1987–91), and Gene Harris (1989–90).

Moore's first recording as leader was for Reservoir Records in 1985. He subsequently recorded for Landmark, Criss Cross, and Savoy. Starting in 1995, he was part of Kevin Eubanks's band for The Tonight Show.

Discography

As leader
 1985: Round Trip (Reservoir)
 1987: 623 C Street (Criss Cross)
 1988: Rejuvenate! (Criss Cross)
 1988: Images (Landmark)
 1990: Furthermore (Landmark)
 1993: Who It Is You Are (Savoy)
 2019: Three Score (WJ3)

As sideman
With Kenny Barron
Invitation (Criss Cross Jazz, 1991)
With Billy Hart
 Rah (Gramavision, 1988)
With Freddie Hubbard
 Bolivia (Music Masters, 1991)
With Bobby Hutcherson
Cruisin' the 'Bird (Landmark, 1988)
With Jimmy Knepper
Dream Dancing (Criss Cross, 1986)
With Oscar Peterson
 Oscar Peterson Meets Roy Hargrove and Ralph Moore (1996, Telarc)
With Valery Ponomarev
 Means of Identification (Reservoir, 1985 [1987])
Trip to Moscow (Reservoir, 1987)
With Rob Schneiderman
 Radio Waves (Reservoir, 1991)
With Superblue
 Superblue 2 (1989, Blue Note)
With Cedar Walton
Mosaic (Music Masters, 1990 [1992]) as Eastern Rebellion
Simple Pleasure (Music Masters, 1993) as Eastern Rebellion
 Composer (Astor Place, 1996
Ray Brown Trio, Moore Makes Four, 1990

References

1956 births
Living people
English jazz saxophonists
British male saxophonists
Criss Cross Jazz artists
Enja Records artists
Savoy Records artists
Landmark Records artists
21st-century saxophonists
21st-century British male musicians
British male jazz musicians
The Tonight Show Band members
Superblue (band) members
Reservoir Records artists